Barrett Deems (March 1, 1914 – September 15, 1998) was an American swing drummer from Springfield, Illinois, United States. He worked in bands led by Jimmy Dorsey, Louis Armstrong, Red Norvo, and Muggsy Spanier.

In High Society, a 1956 film, performing drum solo during a scene on the back of the bus. Louis Armstrong and His All Stars play the song "Now You Has Jazz", the movie's star, Bing Crosby, introduces the band members, including Deems, who then performs a short drum solo.

Deems was married twice. He died of pneumonia in Chicago aged 84 in September 1998. He left behind his wife, Jane Johnson who is living as of 2022 and resides in Illinois.

References

External links

Barrett Deems page at Drummerworld
Barrett Deems Interview NAMM Oral History Library (1998)
Guide to the Barrett Deems Papers circa 1950s-1999 at the University of Chicago Special Collections Research Center
Barrett Deems recordings at the Discography of American Historical Recordings.

1914 births
1998 deaths
American jazz drummers
Swing drummers
People from Springfield, Illinois
Delmark Records artists
Deaths from pneumonia in Illinois
20th-century American drummers
American male drummers
Jazz musicians from Illinois
20th-century American male musicians
American male jazz musicians
Saints & Sinners (jazz band) members